Savage Mode is a collaborative extended play by Atlanta-based rapper 21 Savage and American record producer Metro Boomin. It was released on July 15, 2016. The EP was self-released. The EP received acclaim from critics, with Rolling Stone including it in its list of the 40 Best Rap Albums of 2016. A sequel album, Savage Mode II, was released on October 2, 2020 to further acclaim.

Critical reception

Pitchfork called the project 21 Savage's "strongest and bleakest work" and praised the "brooding, eerie production" by Metro Boomin. Complex called it "a minor masterpiece in sound design", noting that "for as merciless as 21 Savage's writing can be, the album borders on ambient." HotNewHipHop stated that "its style unequivocally trumps its substance, which is par for the course in this school of arty street rap, but its form a compact, impeccably-curated product is sorely missing from the genre." Exclaim! called the album "a grim, pearl clutching narrative straight from the South." In a positive review, Craig Jenkins of Vulture called it "gleefully ultraviolent and pridefully indulgent", stating that "this music is built from the same casual hopelessness that shocks us cold whenever we awake to fresh news of mass murder or police brutality."

Track listing

Notes
 "X" was originally titled "X Bitch"

Charts

Weekly charts

Year-end charts

Certifications

References

2016 albums
21 Savage albums
Metro Boomin albums
Albums produced by Metro Boomin
Albums produced by Southside (record producer)
Albums produced by Cubeatz
Albums produced by Sonny Digital
Albums produced by Zaytoven
Collaborative albums